St James' Church, Stretham, is an active Anglican church in the village of Stretham, Cambridgeshire, England. Founded in the 12th century, it was heavily restored by the architect J. P. St Aubyn in 1876. English Heritage, a body responsible for preserving historical sites in the United Kingdom, assessed the church a Grade II* listed building. The turret clock on the east face of the tower was also made in 1876, by JB Joyce & Co of Whitchurch, Shropshire, and still keeps good time. The church has a ring of six bells hung for change ringing. Regular ringing resumed at the church in June 2011 after several years' silence. St James' is one of eight churches in the Ely Team Ministry.

History

St James' Church stands in the centre of the small village of Stretham, which has a population of 1,685. The earliest written record of this still active church is in the Liber Eliensis, a 12th-century history of the Isle of Ely. In 1137, during Bishop Nigel's (c. 1100–1169) time, Anglo-Saxon conspirators were said to have met in Stretham church. Fragments of the east chancel are known to be from about the 12th century, corroborating the record of the church's existence in that period.

Lancelot Ridley (d. 1576), appointed one of the first Six Preachers of Canterbury Cathedral in 1541 and a rector of Stretham from 1560, was buried in the parish. Mark Ridley (1560–1624), one of Lancelot's sons, became the physician to the Tsar of Russia.

In 1751, Francis Blomefield, in his Collectanea Cantabrigiensia, recorded St James' as having a square tower, with four bells and a clock. The north aisle was leaded and there was a chantry chapel at the east end with a screen. He concludes this to be the Chancel of the Resurrection. At this time, the south aisle, nave and chancel were also recorded as leaded.

The church was restored very heavily in 1876 by the architect J. P. St Aubyn at a cost of £4,400 (equivalent to £ in ). The north and south transepts were added at this time as well as the whole south aisle of the nave, the chancel, a clerestory and a new porch.

St James' Church, Stretham, is an historic building protected by Acts of Parliament. Originally, the church was listed Grade A in a publicly available register on 5 February 1952 until a resurvey and regrading by the English Heritage on 19 August 1988. Since then, it is listed as a Grade II* building, which makes the church particularly important to the country's heritage and warrants every effort to preserve it.  The church records are kept in the County Records Office, Cambridge. Since 1990, St James' Church has had an ecumenical agreement with the Stretham Methodists.

St James' is part of the Ely Team Ministry, a group of eight churches: St Mary's, Ely; St Peter's, Ely; St Leonard's, Little Downham; St Michael and All Angels, Chettisham; St George's, Little Thetford; St James, Stretham; Holy Cross, Stuntney; St Peter's, Prickwillow. The Prickwillow church was closed for worship in 2008; it is part of the parish of St Mary's, Ely.

Architecture

Exterior
The building is mainly 14th century although the east wall of the chancel contains remnants of 12th-century material, including two clamped buttresses. The ashlar-faced tower is 14th century with angled buttresses north and south. The west window has three lights with flowing tracery. The clock on the east face of the tower, dated 1876, is by JB Joyce & Co of Whitchurch, Shropshire, the oldest firm of tower clockmakers in the world; it is wound weekly by the churchwardens.

The east wall of the chancery has one window with five lights (stained glass panels) with tracery above in a Gothic style. The church floodlighting is supported by funds from the National Lottery church floodlighting trust

Interior

There is a lowered sill on the southeast window of the chancel for a three-seat (sedilia); a cabinet (aumbry) is along the east of the north wall with an arched tomb recess to the west of it with an inscribed tomb lid which commemorates Nicholas de Kyngestone, late 13th-century rector. A 1440 oak screen to the chancel is very finely carved. Lying in the chancel is a black marble slab that dates back to 1667; it is a memorial, commemorating Anne Brunsell, sister of Sir Christopher Wren and wife of the rector of the time. The pipe rack organ, built in 1886 by J W Walker and sons of London, is in a chamber built onto the south wall of the chancery. Paddy Benson of Norman & Beard, carried out a reconstruction and enlargement of the organ in 1907 at a cost of £350 (equivalent to £ in ); it was converted to electric blowing sometime after 1937.

Bells
Until 1952, the church had a ring of five bells hung for change ringing; and at this time, a sixth bell was added and one bell was recast, replacing a 1727 bell by Henry Penn of Peterborough. The oldest bell as of 2010, is the   number four bell of 1796 by Joseph Eayre; the newest are of 1951 by John Taylor & Co of Loughborough. This set of six bells are rung from a first-floor ringing chamber above the recently constructed servery and toilets.

According to Canon K W H Felstead's records, now maintained by the Central Council of Church Bell Ringers, there have been 78 peals rung at St James' Church, Stretham, since 1952.

Rectors

Records before 1523 have not been confirmed; they have been checked (other than minor spelling differences) with the painted board in the south-west corner of the nave

References
Footnotes

Notes

Bibliography

Further reading

External links
 
 "Ringing World", The Weekly Journal for Church Bell Ringers since 1911

Grade II* listed churches in Cambridgeshire
12th-century church buildings in England
14th-century church buildings in England
19th-century Church of England church buildings
Church of England church buildings in Cambridgeshire
James